The Pittsburgh Film Office (PFO) is a non-profit 501(c)3 corporation dedicated to economic development in the Pittsburgh and southwestern Pennsylvania region.  Created in 1990, the mission of the PFO is to attract film production projects to the greater Southwestern Pennsylvania region; provide information on the region, locations, vendors and crew; and to coordinate government and business offices in support of production.  In addition, the film office is a conduit for information, providing assistance to local filmmakers and the local film industry throughout Allegheny County and the designated ten county region.

Since its creation, the Film Office has assisted with over 200 major feature and television projects, and claims an economic impact of more than $1.2 billion in southwestern Pennsylvania. In 2007, the Film Office played a major role in supporting of the Pennsylvania Film Tax Credit, a program that allows a 25% tax credit to productions that spend at least 60% of the production budget in the Commonwealth.  This tax credit has been a decisive factor in bringing the filming of several recent movies to the state.

The Pittsburgh Film Office is a member of the Association of Film Commissioners International.

"Lights! Glamour! Action!" Oscar Gala

The Academy Awards benefit, “Lights! Glamour! Action!,” is an annual Gala supporting the Pittsburgh Film Office.

The 2011 "Pittsburgh Stars" video was broadcast in 3D. Over 900 people gathered to watch the live telecast of the Academy Awards at Stage AE.  Six local salons styled models based on nominated films and graced the stage during a live fashion presentation.  More than 160 items were featured in the silent auction.

Although the 2020 Oscars went without a host, Michelle Wright and Ashley Dougherty from WTAE (ABC) hosted the second consecutive year of Pittsburgh's biggest night in film. The 20th annual Lights! Glamour! Action! drew 750 attendees to The Pennsylvanian on February 8, 2020, dressed in the nines.

Event History

See also 

List of films shot in Pittsburgh
List of television shows shot in Pittsburgh
Three Rivers Film Festival
Pittsburgh Filmmakers' School of Film, Photography, and Digital Media

External links
Pittsburgh Film Office Website
Pittsburgh Film Office on Twitter
Pittsburgh Film Office on Facebook
PopCity Media article on the office's origins
1983 article on the office and filming in Pittsburgh

References

Mass media in Pittsburgh
Government of Pittsburgh
Government of Pennsylvania

Cinema of Pennsylvania